The following is a list of the women's national ice hockey players for Canada in various international competitions.

Winter Olympics

2018 Winter Olympics
Head coach: Laura Schuler

Goaltenders
 Shannon Szabados
 Geneviève Lacasse
 Ann-Renée Desbiens

Skaters

Defence
Renata Fast
Laura Fortino
Brigette Lacquette
Jocelyne Larocque – A
Lauriane Rougeau
Meaghan Mikkelson

Forwards
Meghan Agosta – A
Bailey Bram
Emily Clark
Mélodie Daoust
Haley Irwin
Brianne Jenner – A
Rebecca Johnston
Sarah Nurse
Marie-Philip Poulin – C
Jillian Saulnier
Natalie Spooner
Laura Stacey
Blayre Turnbull
Jennifer Wakefield

2014 Winter Olympics
Head coach: Kevin Dineen

Goaltenders
 Shannon Szabados
 Geneviève Lacasse
 Charline Labonté

Skaters

Defence
Jocelyne Larocque
Lauriane Rougeau
Laura Fortino
Meaghan Mikkelson
Catherine Ward
Tara Watchorn

Forwards
Meghan Agosta
Rebecca Johnston
Jennifer Wakefield
Gillian Apps
Caroline Ouellette – C
Mélodie Daoust
Jayna Hefford – A
Brianne Jenner
Haley Irwin
Hayley Wickenheiser – A
Natalie Spooner
Marie-Philip Poulin

2010 Winter Olympics
Head coach: Melody Davidson

Goaltenders
Charline Labonté
Kim St-Pierre
Shannon Szabados

Skaters
Defence
Tessa Bonhomme
Carla MacLeod
Becky Kellar
Colleen Sostorics
Meaghan Mikkelson
Catherine Ward

Forwards
Meghan Agosta
Gillian Apps
Jennifer Botterill
Jayna Hefford – A
Haley Irwin
Rebecca Johnston
Gina Kingsbury
Caroline Ouellette – A
Cherie Piper
Marie-Philip Poulin
Sarah Vaillancourt
Hayley Wickenheiser – C

2006 Winter Olympics
Head coach: Melody Davidson

Goaltenders
Charline Labonté
Kim St-Pierre
Sami Jo Small

Skaters
Meghan Agosta
Gillian Apps
Jennifer Botterill
Cassie Campbell
Gillian Ferrari
Danielle Goyette
Jayna Hefford
Becky Kellar
Gina Kingsbury
Carla MacLeod
Caroline Ouellette
Cherie Piper
Cheryl Pounder
Colleen Sostorics
Vicky Sunohara
Sarah Vaillancourt
Katie Weatherston
Hayley Wickenheiser

2002 Winter Olympics
Head coach: Danièle Sauvageau

Goaltenders
Charline Labonté
Sami Jo Small
Kim St-Pierre

Defence
Thérèse Brisson
Isabelle Chartrand
Geraldine Heaney
Becky Kellar
Cheryl Pounder
Colleen Sostorics

Forwards	
Dana Antal
Kelly Bechard
Jennifer Botterill
Cassie Campbell
Lori Dupuis
Danielle Goyette
Jayna Hefford
Caroline Ouellette
Cherie Piper
Tammy Lee Shewchuk	
Vicky Sunohara	
Hayley Wickenheiser

1998 Winter Olympics
Head coach: Shannon Miller

Goaltenders
Lesley Reddon
Manon Rhéaume

Defence
Thérèse Brisson
Cassie Campbell
Judy Diduck
Geraldine Heaney
Becky Kellar
Fiona Smith

Forwards
Jennifer Botterill
Nancy Drolet
Lori Dupuis
Danielle Goyette
Jayna Hefford
Kathy McCormack
Karen Nystrom
Laura Schuler
France Saint-Louis
Vicky Sunohara
Hayley Wickenheiser
Stacy Wilson

IIHF World Women's Championships

2019 Women's Ice Hockey World Championships
Head coach: Perry Pearn

Goaltenders
Shannon Szabados
Geneviève Lacasse
Emerance Maschmeyer

Defence
Jocelyne Larocque
Brigette Lacquette
Laura Fortino
Micah Zandee-Hart
Jaime Bourbonnais
Erin Ambrose
Renata Fast

Forwards
Rebecca Johnston
Laura Stacey
Jillian Saulnier
Mélodie Daoust
Brianne Jenner
Sarah Nurse
Natalie Spooner
Emily Clark
Marie-Philip Poulin
Loren Gabel
Ann-Sophie Bettez
Blayre Turnbull
Jamie Lee Rattray

2017 IIHF Women's World Championship
Head coach: Laura Schuler

Goaltenders
Shannon Szabados
Geneviève Lacasse
Emerance Maschmeyer

Defence
Brigette Lacquette
Lauriane Rougeau
Laura Fortino
Meaghan Mikkelson
Halli Krzyzaniak
Erin Ambrose
Renata Fast

Forwards
Meghan Agosta
Rebecca Johnston
Jennifer Wakefield
Bailey Bram
Brianne Jenner
Haley Irwin
Natalie Spooner
Emily Clark
Marie-Philip Poulin
Sarah Davis
Blayre Turnbull
Laura Stacey
Sarah Potomak

2016 IIHF Women's World Championship
Head coach: Laura Schuler

Goaltenders
Charline Labonté
Erica Howe
Emerance Maschmeyer

Defence
Brigette Lacquette
Meaghan Mikkelson
Laura Fortino
Halli Krzyzaniak
Lauriane Rougeau
Jocelyne Larocque
Tara Watchorn

Forwards
Meghan Agosta
Rebecca Johnston
Jamie Lee Rattray
Jennifer Wakefield
Jillian Saulnier
Bailey Bram
Brianne Jenner
Hayley Wickenheiser
Natalie Spooner
Marie-Philip Poulin
Sarah Davis
Emily Clark
Blayre Turnbull

2015 IIHF Women's World Championship
Head coach: Doug Derraugh

Goaltenders
Emerance Maschmeyer
Ann-Renée Desbiens
Geneviève Lacasse

Defence
Brigette Lacquette
Courtney Birchard
Laura Fortino
Halli Krzyzaniak
Lauriane Rougeau
Jocelyne Larocque
Tara Watchorn

Forwards
Rebecca Johnston
Jamie Lee Rattray
Jennifer Wakefield
Jillian Saulnier
Caroline Ouellette
Bailey Bram
Brianne Jenner
Haley Irwin
Natalie Spooner
Jessica Campbell
Marie-Philip Poulin
Sarah Davis
Emily Clark
Kelly Terry

2013 IIHF Women's World Championship
Head coach: Dan Church

Goaltenders
Charline Labonté
Geneviève Lacasse
Shannon Szabados

Defence
Jocelyne Larocque
Meaghan Mikkelson
Catherine Ward
Tessa Bonhomme
Courtney Birchard
Laura Fortino
Lauriane Rougeau

Forwards
Meghan Agosta
Rebecca Johnston
Jennifer Wakefield
Gillian Apps
Caroline Ouellette
Jayna Hefford
Bailey Bram
Brianne Jenner
Haley Irwin
Hayley Wickenheiser – C
Natalie Spooner
Sarah Vaillancourt
Marie-Philip Poulin

2012 IIHF Women's World Championship
Head coach: Dan Church

Goaltenders
Charline Labonté
Geneviève Lacasse
Shannon Szabados

Defence
Jocelyne Larocque
Meaghan Mikkelson
Tessa Bonhomme
Catherine Ward
Courtney Birchard
Laura Fortino
Lauriane Rougeau

Forwards
Meghan Agosta
Gillian Apps
Vicki Bendus
Bailey Bram
Jayna Hefford
Haley Irwin
Brianne Jenner
Rebecca Johnston
Caroline Ouellette
Marie-Philip Poulin
Natalie Spooner
Jennifer Wakefield
Hayley Wickenheiser – C

2011 IIHF Women's World Championship
Head coach: Ryan Walter

Goaltenders
Charline Labonté
Kim St-Pierre
Shannon Szabados

Defence
Jocelyne Larocque
Meaghan Mikkelson
Catherine Ward
Tessa Bonhomme
Bobbi-Jo Slusar
Tara Watchorn

Forwards
Meghan Agosta
Rebecca Johnston
Cherie Piper
Gillian Apps
Caroline Ouellette
Jayna Hefford
Jennifer Wakefield
Haley Irwin
Hayley Wickenheiser – C
Natalie Spooner
Sarah Vaillancourt
Marie-Philip Poulin

2009 Women's World Ice Hockey Championships
Head coach: Melody Davidson

Goaltenders
Charline Labonté
Kim St-Pierre
Shannon Szabados

Defence
Tessa Bonhomme
Gillian Ferarri
Becky Kellar
Carla MacLeod
Colleen Sostorics
Catherine Ward

Forwards
Meghan Agosta
Gillian Apps
Jennifer Botterill
Jayna Hefford
Rebecca Johnston
Gina Kingsbury
Haley Irwin
Meaghan Mikkelson
Caroline Ouellette
Marie-Philip Poulin
Hayley Wickenheiser
Sarah Vaillancourt

2008 Women's World Ice Hockey Championships
Head coach: Peter Smith

Goaltenders
 Charline Labonté
 Kim St-Pierre

Defence
 Delaney Collins
 Gillian Ferarri
 Becky Kellar
 Carla MacLeod
 Meaghan Mikkelson
 Colleen Sostorics

Forwards
 Meghan Agosta
 Gillian Apps
 Kelly Bechard
 Jennifer Botterill
 Jayna Hefford
 Rebecca Johnston
 Gina Kingsbury
 Caroline Ouellette
 Cherie Piper
 Sarah Vaillancourt
 Katie Weatherston
 Hayley Wickenheiser

2007 Women's World Ice Hockey Championships
Head coach: Melody Davidson

Goaltenders
 Charline Labonté
 Kim St-Pierre

Defence
 Tessa Bonhomme
 Delaney Collins 
 Gillian Ferarri
 Carla MacLeod
 Cheryl Pounder
 Colleen Sostorics

Forwards
 Meghan Agosta
 Gillian Apps
 Kelly Bechard
 Jennifer Botterill
 Danielle Goyette
 Jayna Hefford
 Gina Kingsbury
 Caroline Ouellette
 Vicky Sunohara
 Sarah Vaillancourt
 Katie Weatherston
 Hayley Wickenheiser

2005 Women's World Ice Hockey Championships
Head coach: Melody Davidson

Goaltenders
 Charline Labonté
 Kim St-Pierre

Defence
 Correne Bredin
 Delaney Collins
 Becky Kellar
 Carla MacLeod
 Cheryl Pounder
 Colleen Sostorics

Forwards
 Gillian Apps
 Kelly Bechard
 Jennifer Botterill
 Cassie Campbell
 Danielle Goyette
 Jayna Hefford
 Gina Kingsbury
 Caroline Ouellette
 Cherie Piper
 Vicky Sunohara
 Sarah Vaillancourt
 Hayley Wickenheiser

2004 Women's World Ice Hockey Championships
Head coach: Karen Hughes

Goaltenders
 Kim St-Pierre 
 Sami Jo Small

Defence
 Thérèse Brisson
 Delaney Collins
 Gillian Ferarri
 Becky Kellar
 Cheryl Pounder
 Colleen Sostorics

Forwards
 Gillian Apps
 Dana Antal
 Kelly Bechard
 Jennifer Botterill
 Cassie Campbell
 Gina Kingsbury
 Danielle Goyette
 Jayna Hefford
 Caroline Ouellette
 Cherie Piper
 Vicky Sunohara
 Hayley Wickenheiser

Alternates
 Sarah Vaillancourt (forward)
 Charline Labonté (goaltender)

2001 Women's World Ice Hockey Championships
Head coach: Daniele Sauvageau

Goaltenders
Kim St-Pierre
Sami Jo Small

Skaters
Dana Antal
Kelly Bechard
Jennifer Botterill
Correne Bredin
Thérèse Brisson
Cassie Campbell
Isabelle Chartrand
Nancy Drolet
Danielle Goyette
Geraldine Heaney
Jayna Hefford
Becky Kellar
Gina Kingsbury
Caroline Ouellette
Cheryl Pounder
Tammy Lee Shewchuk
Colleen Sostorics
Vicky Sunohara

2000 IIHF Women's World Championship
Head coach: Melody Davidson

Goaltenders
Kim St-Pierre
Sami Jo Small

Skaters
Kelly Bechard
Amanda Benoit
Jennifer Botterill
Thérèse Brisson
Cassie Campbell
Delaney Collins
Nancy Drolet
Lori Dupuis
Danielle Goyette
Geraldine Heaney
Jayna Hefford
Becky Kellar
Caroline Ouellette
Cheryl Pounder
Nathalie Rivard
Tammy Lee Shewchuk
Vicky Sunohara
Hayley Wickenheiser

1999 IIHF Women's World Championship
Head coach: Daniele Sauvageau

Goaltenders
Kim St-Pierre
Sami Jo Small

Skaters
Amanda Benoit
Thérèse Brisson
Jennifer Botterill
Cassie Campbell
Nancy Drolet
Lori Dupuis
Danielle Goyette
Geraldine Heaney
Jayna Hefford
Becky Kellar
Mai-Lan Le
Caroline Ouellette
Cheryl Pounder
Nathalie Rivard
France Saint-Louis
Fiona Smith
Vicky Sunohara
Hayley Wickenheiser

1997 IIHF Women's World Championship
Head coach: Shannon Miller

Goaltenders
Danielle Dube
Lesley Reddon

Skaters
Thérèse Brisson
Cassie Campbell
Judy Diduck
Nancy Drolet
Lori Dupuis
Rebecca Fahey
Danielle Goyette
Geraldine Heaney
Jayna Hefford
Angela James
Luce Letendre
Karen Nystrom
France Saint-Louis
Laura Schuler
Fiona Smith
Vicky Sunohara
Hayley Wickenheiser
Stacy Wilson

1994 IIHF Women's World Championship
Head coach: Les Lawton

Goaltenders
Lesley Reddon
Manon Rhéaume

Skaters
Thérèse Brisson
Cassie Campbell
Judy Diduck
Nancy Drolet
Danielle Goyette
Marianne Grnak
Geraldine Heaney
Andria Hunter
Angela James
Laura Leslie
Karen Nystrom
Margot Page
Nathalie Picard
Cheryl Pounder
Jane Robinson
France Saint-Louis
Hayley Wickenheiser
Stacy Wilson

1992 IIHF Women's World Championship
Head coach: Rick Polutnik

Goaltenders
Manon Rhéaume
Marie-Claude Roy

Skaters
Judy Diduck
Nancy Drolet
Heather Ginzel
Danielle Goyette
Geraldine Heaney
Andria Hunter
Angela James
Dawn McGuire
Diane Michaud
France Montour
Karen Nystrom
Nathalie Picard
Nathalie Rivard
France Saint-Louis
Sue Scherer
Laura Schuler
Margot Verlaan
Stacy Wilson

1990 IIHF Women's World Championship
Head coach: Dave McMaster

Goaltenders
 Denise Caron
 Cathy Phillips

Defence
 Judy Diduck
 Geraldine Heaney
 Teresa Hutchinson
 Dawn McGuire
 Diane Michaud
 Brenda Richard
 
Forwards
 Shirley Cameron
 Heather Ginzel
 Angela James
 France Montour
 Kim Ratushny
 Sue Scherer
 Laura Schuler
 France Saint-Louis
 Vicky Sunohara
 Margot Verlaan
 Stacy Wilson
 Susie Yuen

See also

 Ice hockey at the 2006 Winter Olympics
 Ice hockey at the 2006 Winter Olympics match stats (women)
 Ice hockey
 Ice hockey statistics
 List of United States women's national ice hockey team rosters

References

Canada
Canadian
rosters